Lachlan Fitzgibbon (born 5 January 1994) is an Australian professional rugby league footballer who plays as  forward for the Newcastle Knights in the NRL.

Background
Fitzgibbon was born in North Sydney, New South Wales, Australia and moved to Newcastle at a young age.

He played his junior rugby league for the South Newcastle Lions in the Newcastle Rugby League. He was then signed by the Newcastle Knights.

Fitzgibbon is the son of nib CEO Mark Fitzgibbon and nephew of Australian Labor Party MP Joel Fitzgibbon. Lachlan's grandfather is Eric Fitzgibbon who was an MP for the electorate of Hunter.

Playing career

Early career
In 2013 and 2014, Fitzgibbon played for the Newcastle Knights' NYC team.

2015
In 2015, Fitzgibbon moved on to the Knights' New South Wales Cup team. In round 21 of the 2015 NRL season, he made his NRL debut for the Knights against the St. George Illawarra Dragons. This would be Fitzgibbon's only appearance for the first grade team in the 2015 NRL season as the club finished last on the table.

In August, Fitzgibbon re-signed with the Newcastle club on a two-year contract.

On 27 September, he played in the Knights' 2015 New South Wales Cup Grand Final win over the Wyong Roos at Parramatta Stadium.

2016
Fitzgibbon made five appearances for Newcastle in the 2016 NRL season as the club finished last for a second consecutive year.  He scored his first try in the top grade against North Queensland in round 13 of the competition.

2017
Fitzgibbon made his first NRL appearance of the 2017 NRL season in round 10, going on to play in 14 matches and scoring 8 tries as the club finished last for a third straight season. In September, he re-signed with Newcastle on a two-year contract until the end of 2019.

2018
Fitzgibbon made 21 appearances and scored nine tries for Newcastle in the 2018 NRL season as the club finished 11th on the table.

2019
Fitzgibbon played 21 games and scored five tries for Newcastle in the 2019 NRL season as the club finished a disappointing 11th on the table.  At the start of the year, many tipped Newcastle to reach the finals after the club recruited heavily in the off-season.

2020
He made 17 appearances for Newcastle in the 2020 NRL season including the club's first finals game since 2013 which was an elimination finals loss against South Sydney.

2021
Fitzgibbon only 10 games for Newcastle in the 2021 NRL season and did not play in the club's elimination finals loss against Parramatta.

2022
Fitzgibbon was limited to only nine appearances for Newcastle in the 2022 NRL season as the club finished 14th on the table.

References

External links

Newcastle Knights profile

1994 births
Living people
Australian rugby league players
Newcastle Knights players
Rugby league players from Sydney
Rugby league second-rows
South Newcastle Lions players